Maciej Krakowiak (born 7 September 1992) is a Polish professional footballer who plays as a goalkeeper for KKS 1925 Kalisz.

Career statistics

Club

Notes

References

External links
 Maciej Krakowiak Interview

1992 births
Footballers from Łódź
Living people
Polish footballers
Poland youth international footballers
Association football goalkeepers
Górnik Konin players
GKS Bełchatów players
Chojniczanka Chojnice players
Widzew Łódź players
Odra Opole players
Stal Rzeszów players
FC Imabari players
Ekstraklasa players
I liga players
II liga players
III liga players
Japan Football League players
Polish expatriate footballers
Polish expatriate sportspeople in Japan
Expatriate footballers in Japan